Notes on a Scandal  is the soundtrack, on the Rounder Records label, of the 2006 Academy Award- and Golden Globe-nominated film Notes on a Scandal, starring Dame Judi Dench, Cate Blanchett, Bill Nighy, Tom Georgeson and Michael Maloney. The original score and songs were composed by Philip Glass.

The album was nominated for the Academy Award for Best Original Score.

Track listing 
Music composed by Philip Glass
"First Day of School" – 2:42
"The History" – 2:53
"Invitation" – 1:29
"The Harts" – 2:16
"Discovery" – 3:01
"Confession" – 1:45
"Stalking" – 1:53
"Courage" – 2:17
"Sheba & Steven" – 1:23
"The Promise" – 2:54
"Good Girl" – 3:00
"Sheba's Longing" – 2:32
"Someone in Your Garden" – 1:51
"A Life Lived Together" – 3:02
"Someone Has Died" – 2:01
"Betrayal" – 3:43
"It's Your Choice" – 2:39
"Barbara's House" – 3:45
"Going Home" – 2:11
"I Knew Her" – 3:22

Personnel
Michael Riesman - conductor
Nico Muhly - assistant conductor
"Special thanks to Jim Keller, Kurt Munkacsi, Zoe Knight."

2006 soundtrack albums
Philip Glass soundtracks
Rounder Records soundtracks